Vania Franco (born on 11 May 1978) is a Portuguese pool player. A two-time winner of the European Pool Championships in the team event, Franco also reached the final of an event on the Women's Euro Tour in 2014.

References

External links

Living people
1978 births
Portuguese pool players